Ross Grange Penlington (3 March 1931 – 2001) was a former Court of Appeal Judge in Hong Kong.  He was also the Commanding Officer of the Royal Hong Kong Auxiliary Air Force from 1975 – 1983.  Penlington was later appointed to be the Honorary Air Commodore of the Force.

Penlington was born on 3 March 1931 in Christchurch, New Zealand. His father was Cedric Grange Penlington and his mother was Elsie May. He received his education at Elmwood Primary School, Christ's College, and the University of Canterbury; he graduated with an LLB in 1955. Justice Peter Penlington KC (born 1932), also from Christchurch, is his second cousin.

As the Chairman of the Hong Kong Air Transport Licensing Authority in the later 1970s and early 1980s, he had presided over licensing applications which involved BCAL, Cathay, BA, Laker.  He was generally recognised in the industry that his judgements were entirely fair and wise. He retired in 1995 and returned to New Zealand, settling in Taupō. When he died in 2001, he was survived by his wife and their two daughters.

References

Supreme Court (Hong Kong)
1931 births
2001 deaths
People educated at Christ's College, Christchurch
University of Canterbury alumni
Ross
People from Taupō